Ahlefeld-Bistensee is a municipality in the district of Rendsburg-Eckernförde, in Schleswig-Holstein, Germany. It was formed on 1 March 2008 from the former municipalities Ahlefeld and Bistensee.

References

Rendsburg-Eckernförde